The 106th Virginia General Assembly was the meeting of the legislative branch of the Virginia state government from 1910 to 1912, after the 1909 state elections. It convened in Richmond for one session.

Party summary
Resignations and new members are discussed in the "Changes in membership" section, below.

Senate

House of Delegates

Senate

Leadership

Members

Changes in membership

Senate

See also
 List of Virginia state legislatures

References

Government of Virginia
Virginia legislative sessions
1910 in Virginia
1911 in Virginia
1910 U.S. legislative sessions
1911 U.S. legislative sessions